Peter Lassen (October 31, 1800 – April 26, 1859), later known in Spanish as Don Pedro Lassen, was a Danish-born Californian ranchero and gold prospector. Born in Denmark, Lassen immigrated at age 30 to Massachusetts, before eventually finally moving to California (then a part of Mexico). In California, Lassen became a Mexican citizen and received the vast Rancho Bosquejo from Governor Manuel Micheltorena. He is best known as the eponym of Lassen County, California, Lassen Peak, and Lassen Volcanic National Park.

Early life
Peter Lassen was born in Farum, Denmark, and immigrated in 1830 to Boston, Massachusetts. Born to Johanne Sophie Westergaard and Lars Nielsen, Peter was baptized at the age of one week on December 7, 1800.  The patronymic surname Larsen, meaning son of Lars, was applied in his naming and was common among Danish farmers at that time. Lassen used several different spellings while living in Denmark and in Copenhagen, sometimes preferring to be called Peter Larsen Farum, after his birthplace.

When he was seventeen, Lassen moved to Kalundborg to learn blacksmithing. He apprenticed under his uncle, Christian Nielsen until 1823, when he moved to Copenhagen to work under a master blacksmith named Sigersted.

Pioneering California 
In 1840, he immigrated to California and became a rancher. Peter Lassen traveled from Keyetsville, Missouri, to Westport, Missouri, a "common place of rendezvous for overland parties". The expedition Lassen joined was made up of missionaries and adventurers, some on their way to California; others headed to the Columbia River basin in Oregon.

Lassen met the ship Lausanne on the Willamette River in Oregon. He sailed on July 3, 1840, boarding for passage to Bodega Bay, in Sonoma County, California. The travelers were invited to touch land in California at Fort Ross, and stayed on there until they could procure some horses to travel to Sutter's Fort.

Lassen arrived at Sutter's Fort in August 1840, with William Wiggins, who had traveled with him from Westport (now Kansas City, Missouri), over land and by sea for nearly fifteen months starting in May 1839. John Sutter happily welcomed the men and traveled with them from his colony, known at the time as New Helvetia (meaning New Switzerland), to Yerba Buena and Alviso, California, in a small sailboat.

While it is likely he was working as a blacksmith during his early years in California, Lassen traveled to Santa Cruz in 1841, where he oversaw the construction of a sawmill owned by Isaac Graham on Zayante Creek. Lassen was paid 100 mules for his efforts. From the winter of 1840- 1841 Lassen returned to San Jose, with another pioneer blacksmith, William "Guillermo" Gulnac; the two travelling to the upper San Joaquin Valley in the Spring of 1841. In July 1842, the men arrived at "Rancho Campo de los Franceses" but just missed connecting with French-Canadian trappers who worked for the Hudson's Bay Company. Lassen pushed on with his livestock, and instead spent the next few years camped in a hut along the Cosumnes River, working as a travelling blacksmith.

Lassen Emigrant Trail
Lassen established the Lassen Cutoff of the California Trail, which left the main trail near the modern-day Rye Patch Reservoir and crossed a desolate section of what is now northwestern Nevada, including the Black Rock Desert. His cutoff continued to Goose Lake in northeastern California, and then followed the Pit River into California's Central Valley. Portions of this trail were particularly arduous, and many of its early travelers greatly regretted choosing it. The route was extensively traveled during the years 1848 to 1853, but because of the hardships of the route, the trail was little used thereafter. The Applegate Trail also traveled from Rye Patch Reservoir to Goose Lake. (The Applegate Trail was intended as a safer alternative to the main route of the Oregon Trail, and it continued into Oregon's Willamette Valley.)

John D. Unruh, Jr., writes of Lassen's first attempt at using his cutoff, rescued from disaster by a group of well-supplied emigrants from Oregon who helped him reach his ranch:

Here the wily Dane orchestrated a meeting wherein the emigrants supposedly endorsed him as a guide and warmly praised his cutoffs. This deceptive endorsement was rushed eastward to be printed in newspapers and influence credulous forty-niners hell-bent for the gold fields. Planning carefully, Lassen also dispatched agents to divert forty-niners onto the cutoff and to set up trail advertisements (including a signboard at the Lassen Meadows, where the Applegate Trail branched off from the Humboldt River) with the reassuring message that the diggings were a mere 110 miles ahead ... [A later] emigration trustingly followed their lead, many foolishly discarding surplus provisions on the assumption that only 110 miles remained. The suffering of those choosing the Lassen Cutoff was severe, for it proved to be some 200 miles longer than either the Carson or Truckee routes.

Rancher
Lassen was granted in 1844 the  Rancho Bosquejo Mexican land grant in Tehama County by Governor Manuel Micheltorena.  On his fourth expedition to the west, John C. Fremont recorded in his journal that in the spring of 1846 he visited and stayed at the Lassen ranch. Fremont noted that Lassen had brought into cultivation wheat, grapes and cotton. In 1855 Lassen moved to the Honey Lake region, where he prospected and served in the office of surveyor of the unofficial Nataqua Territory.

Death

Lassen was murdered on April 26, 1859 in Clapper Canyon (then known as Black Rock Canyon) in the Black Rock Mountains as he was traveling in the area (later known as Hardin City, Nevada), to prospect for silver. He was traveling along with Edward Clapper and Americus Wyatt; Clapper was killed in the same incident, but Wyatt escaped.  The circumstances surrounding his death remain mysterious. According to Wyatt, Lassen and Clapper were shot by an unseen sniper while breaking camp.

At the time the culprits were widely considered to be Northern Paiute, who were then in a state of unrest, which would soon lead to the Paiute War.  However, Wyatt himself, Pit River Indians, and disgruntled emigrants who followed the Lassen trail, have also been suspected. In particular, an investigation at the time disclosed that none of the supplies of Lassen, Clapper or Wyatt had been taken; in the perception of the investigator, leaving the supplies was not normal conduct for a Native American raiding party at that time, and, as a result, Wyatt himself has been suspected as the murderer of Lassen and Clapper.
William Weatherlow, the Susanville resident, leader of the Honey Lake Rangers, and close friend of Isaac Roop was known to be in the area and was leading the prospecting party Lassen, Clapper, and Wyatt were in search of. Weatherlow was thought by local Indian Agent Major Dodge to have been the murderer under order from Isaac Roop for political gain as Lassen was a prominent and leading candidate for the provisional governorship of the forming Sierra Nevada Territory. Peter Lassen's grave is in Susanville in Lassen County, California, along the eastern foothills of the Sierra Nevada.

Legacy
Banner Lassen Medical Center and Lassen College in Susanville, Lassen National Forest, Lassen Peak, and Lassen Volcanic National Park are named in his honor. In addition there is a Scout troop in his hometown of Farum called Peter Lassen Troop.

In popular culture
The actor Michael Witney portrayed Lassen in a 1968 episode, "The Other Side of the Mountain", of the syndicated television anthology series, Death Valley Days, hosted  by Robert Taylor.

References

Further reading 
Johnston, Ken  (2012) Legendary Truths, Peter Lassen and His Gold Rush Trail in Fact and Fable (Pronghorn Press)

External links 
 
 Biographical statement by Lassen County historian
 Peter Lassen and His Trail at California/Nevada chapter of the Oregon-California Trails Association (CANVOCTA)
 Peter Lassen at WesternStarWiki

1800 births
1859 deaths
1859 murders in the United States
California pioneers
American blacksmiths
American murder victims
Black Rock Desert
Danish emigrants to the United States
Deaths by firearm in Nevada
History of Tehama County, California
Naturalized citizens of Mexican California
Pre-statehood history of Nevada
Ranchers from California
People murdered in California
People from Furesø Municipality
American surveyors
Unsolved murders in the United States